Alexandr Lysenkov (Александр Лысенков ) (born in Moscow, circa 1973) is a Russian rugby league footballer who plays as a  for RC Lokomotiv Moscow in the Championship of Russia competition.

Career
As a child, he played football at the sports school of the Dynamo Moscow. He took up rugby under the guidance of Shamil Akbulatov. In his youth he was a bully, participated in numerous fights and sometimes stole cars, selling them. He made his debut in the first team of Lokomotiv in 1988 at the age of 15 as a rugby union player in a match against Aviator Kyiv, later took up rugby league. He was included in the Russian national side for the 2000 World Cup and has been a regular player in the national set up ever since.
 [3]. He spent one match in the tournament. Many times champion of Russia, he finished his career in 2009 after a series of injuries.

Background
Alexandr Lysenkov was born in Moscow, Russia.

References

External links
Alexandr Lysenkov player profile

Living people
Rugby articles needing expert attention
Russia national rugby league team players
Russian rugby league players
Sportspeople from Moscow
1973 births